Alexandra Moen (born 1978) is an English actress, known for her roles as Emily James in the drama series Hotel Babylon, Tamsin in the drama series Tripping Over, and Lucy Saxon in the science fiction series Doctor Who.

Early life
Moen was born in Pisa, Tuscany, Italy, the daughter of an oceanographer father and teacher mother. She lived briefly in Canada and Bermuda with her two younger brothers, until moving to Britain in 1991. She studied English at Leeds University, later going on to train at the London Academy of Music and Dramatic Art (LAMDA).

Filmography

Film

Television

Stage

References

External links
 
 
 

Alumni of the London Academy of Music and Dramatic Art
21st-century English actresses
English film actresses
English television actresses
Living people
1978 births
People from Pisa